Traicho Draganov is a Bulgarian sprint canoer who competed in the late 1980s and early 1990s. He won two bronze medals at the 1990 ICF Canoe Sprint World Championships in Poznań, earning them in the C-4 500 m and C-4 1000 m events, and one bronze medal at the 1991 ICF Canoe Sprint World Championships in Paris, earning them in C-4 1000 m events.

References

Bulgarian male canoeists
Living people
Year of birth missing (living people)
ICF Canoe Sprint World Championships medalists in Canadian